Privately owned public space (POPS), or alternatively, privately owned public open spaces (POPOS), are terms used to describe a type of public space that, although privately owned, is legally required to be open to the public under a city's zoning ordinance or other land-use law. The acronym POPOS is preferentially used over POPS on the west coast of the US. Both terms can be used to represent either a singular or plural space or spaces.  These spaces are usually the product of a deal between cities and private real estate developers in which cities grant valuable zoning concessions and developers provide in return privately owned public spaces in or near their buildings. Privately owned public spaces commonly include plazas, arcades, small parks, and atriums.  Many cities worldwide, including Auckland, New York City, San Francisco, Dublin, Seattle, Seoul, and Toronto, have privately owned public spaces.  Some cities and advocacy groups have created websites about these spaces (see, for example, apops.mas.org).

History 
Although the term privately owned public space was popularized by Harvard professor Jerold S. Kayden through his 2000 book Privately Owned Public Space: The New York City Experience, written in collaboration with the New York City Department of City Planning and the Municipal Art Society of New York, the history of privately owned public space commenced in 1961 when New York City introduced an incentive zoning mechanism offering developers the right to build 10 square feet of bonus rentable or sellable floor area in return for one square foot of plaza, and three square feet of bonus floor area in return for one square foot of arcade. Between 1961 and 2000, 503 privately owned public spaces, scattered almost entirely in downtown, midtown, and upper east and west sides of New York City's borough of Manhattan, were constructed at 320 buildings.  More spaces have been added since then.  The book cited the quantitative success of the program's public space production but reported that 41 percent of these spaces were of "marginal" quality and roughly 50 percent of buildings had one or more spaces apparently out of compliance with applicable legal requirements resulting in privatization.

While privately owned public space as a term of art refers specifically to private property required to be usable by the public under zoning or similar regulatory arrangements, the phrase in its broadest sense can refer to places, like shopping malls and hotel lobbies, that are privately owned and open to the public, even if they are not legally required to be open to the public.

Opinions 
In 2017, The Guardian published a study of the phenomenon in London, facing a lack of response from both landowners and local authorities they questioned on the subject. Following the report, the Mayor of London, Sadiq Khan promised to publish new guidelines on how these spaces are governed.

See also 

 Fourth and Madison Building
 List of privately owned public spaces in London
 List of privately owned public spaces in New York City
 Private protected area
 Privatization
 Zuccotti Park

References

External links 
 List of privately owned public open spaces in San Francisco

Urban planning
Land use